Li Ying may refer to:

Li Ying (Eastern Han) (died 169), governor of Henan Commandery during the Han dynasty
Li Ying (prince) (died 737), crown prince of the Tang dynasty
Li Ying (Water Margin), a fictional character in the Water Margin
Li Ying (footballer, born 1973), Chinese women's association football player
Li Ying (footballer, born 1993), Chinese women's association football player
Li Ying College, a school in Hong Kong
Ying Li (Marvel Cinematic Universe), a fictional character

Female Chinese volleyball players
Li Ying (volleyball, born 1979) 李颖, player for Bayi Volleyball
Li Ying (volleyball, born 1980) 李颖, beach volleyball player who finished top 6 at the 2005 Beach Volleyball World Championships
Li Ying (volleyball, born 1988) 李莹, player for Tianjin Volleyball
Li Ying (volleyball, born 1995) 李莹, player for Zhejiang women's volleyball team